Best & USA is a 2009 album by the South Korean pop singer BoA. A Japanese issue coinciding with the release of her American first album, BoA, it contains the American album (USA) as well as a compilation of Japanese singles (Best). It was released on March 18, 2009.

Best & USA was better received in Japan than BoA had been in the U.S., reaching #2 on the Oricon weekly album charts. It sold over 100,000 copies and was certified Gold by the Recording Industry Association of Japan. The Japanese songs were also released separately as Best II on April 15, 2009.

History
In 2008, after successfully breaking into the Japanese market, BoA and her label S.M. Entertainment set out to record new material to crack the lucrative U.S. pop market. The label founded a new American branch, S.M. Entertainment USA, and BoA recorded a new album of English material to be promoted in the United States, ultimately titled BoA and released on March 17, 2009.

Coinciding with the American release, BoA also released Best & USA in Japan, including both the new album and a compilation of her Japanese singles. The album was released in several formats mixing the Japanese singles with the new material. BoA promoted Best & USA with appearances in Japan amid her promotions in the United States.

Reception
Adam Greenberg of AllMusic gave the album three stars on the strength of the Japanese compilation, which he found greatly superior to the American recording. In contrast to the "basic and straightforward" American songs, he found that the Japanese singles showcased BoA's strengths as a singer and gave the album value as a compilation of her material.

Track listing

Charts

References

BoA albums
Avex Group compilation albums
2009 greatest hits albums